Full Fat is an independent British video game developer. The company was founded in 1996. The company's speciality has been developing games for hand-held devices including Nintendo's Game Boy, Game Boy Advance, Nintendo DS, Sony's PlayStation Portable (PSP), and lately mobile devices (iOS and Android). Other platforms include Sega's Dreamcast, Nintendo's Wii, and Microsoft Windows.
Originally based in Leamington Spa, England, the company moved to Coventry in 2001 and Warwick in 2011.

Developed titles
iOS
Sugar Rush
NFL Kicker 13
NFL Quarterback 13
Agent Dash
NFL Kicker!
NFL Flick Quarterback
Flick Soccer!
Flick Golf Extreme!
Coin Drop!
Hotspot Football
Flick Golf!
Zombie Flick
Deadball Specialist

Android
Sugar Rush
NFL Kicker 13
NFL Quarterback 13
Agent Dash
NFL Kicker!
NFL Flick Quarterback
Flick Soccer!
Flick Golf Extreme!
Coin Drop!
Flick Golf!
Zombie Flick

DS
Harry Potter and the Deathly Hallows – Part 2
Harry Potter and the Deathly Hallows – Part 1
The Sims 2: Apartment Pets
The Sims 2: Castaway
The Sims 2: Pets
Spore Hero Arena
Littlest Pet Shop
Jambo! Safari
Biker Mice from Mars
Harlem Globetrotters: World Tour
Touch Darts

GBA
The Grim Adventures of Billy & Mandy
Harlem Globetrotters: World Tour
Pac-Man World 2
Pac-Man World
Ms. Pac-Man Maze Madness
Backyard Skateboarding
Beyblade G-Revolution
Beyblade V-Force
Monopoly
Sim City 2000
Aggressive Inline
Dave Mirra Freestyle BMX 3
Dave Mirra Freestyle BMX 2
Justice League: Chronicles
Punch King
Animaniacs
Freekstyle
The Land Before Time

PSP
Advent Shadow (cancelled)
Sid Meier's Pirates!
Xyanide

Wii
My Sims Collection
Littlest Pet Shop
Jambo! Safari

External links
Official Full Fat website

Video game companies of the United Kingdom
Video game development companies
Video game companies established in 1996
 
Companies based in Warwick
1996 establishments in England